FNI may refer to:
 Fania language, spoken in Chad
 Fellow of the Nautical Institute
 Frankfurt Niederrad station, in Germany
 Friday Nite Improvs
 Fridtjof Nansen Institute, a Norwegian research institute
 International Naturist Federation
 National Car Registration Record, the 1950-2009 French car registration system. 
 Nationalist and Integrationist Front, a rebel group in the Democratic Republic of the Congo
 Nîmes–Alès–Camargue–Cévennes Airport, in France